This list of museums includes museums in the municipality of Madrid, the capital of Spain.

Art museums

Museo del Prado
Thyssen-Bornemisza Museum
Museo Nacional Centro de Arte Reina Sofía
Atocha Headquarters (Sabatini and Nouvel buildings)
Palacio de Velázquez (Retiro Park)
Palacio de Cristal (Retiro Park)
Royal Academy of Fine Arts of San Fernando Museum
Royal Palace
Liria Palace
Museo Coleccion SOLO (Retiro Park)
Sorolla Museum
Lázaro Galdiano Museum
Cerralbo Museum
Museum of Romanticism
Museo Nacional de Artes Decorativas
Museo de Arte Contemporáneo

Museo ABC

Convent of Las Descalzas Reales
Royal Monastery of La Encarnación
Royal Chapel of St. Anthony of La Florida
Royal Collections Museum
Banco de España
Piarist Fathers Calasanctian Museum
House-Museum of Manuel Benedito
Fuente del Rey House Museum
Félix Cañada Museum

History museums

National Archaeological Museum of Spain
Museum of the Americas
Royal Armoury of Madrid
Madrid History Museum
Temple of Debod
House-Museum of Lope de Vega
Pantheon of Illustrious Men
Platform 0
Chamberí Station
Pacífico Power Plant
Caños del Peral Museum-Ópera Station
Paleontological site-Carpetana Station
Old lobby-Pacífico Station
Bullfighting Museum
Museum of the History of the Jewish Community of Madrid

Arts and cultural centers

CaixaForum Madrid
Círculo de Bellas Artes
Fundación Mapfre  (Mapfre Foundation)
Bárbara de Braganza Hall
Recoletos Hall
Fundación Juan March (Juan March Foundation)
La Casa Encendida
Matadero Madrid Cultural Center
Abierto X Obras

Extensión AVAM
Naves Matadero-International Living Arts Centre
Centro Cultural Conde Duque Cultural Center
Centro Centro Cultural Center
Centro de Arte Canal (Canal Art Center)
Fundación Canal (Canal Foundation)
Art Rooms of the Autonomous Community of Madrid

Youth Art Room
 ( and )

Espacio Fundación Telefónica

Cervantes Institute
Caryatid Building (Madrid)
Colegio del Rey (Alcalá de Henares)

Mexican Cultural Institute (Embassy of Mexico)

Carlos de Amberes Foundation
Athenæum of Madrid
Residencia de Estudiantes

María Cristina Masaveu Peterson Foundation

Tabacalera Espacio Promoción del Arte, managed by the Fine Arts Promotion Sub-Department of the Spanish Education, Culture and Sport Ministry
Self-managed Social Center La Tabacalera de Lavapiés (Centro Social Autogestionado La Tabacalera de Lavapiés)
La Neomudéjar Avant-garde Arts Center, Museum and International Artistic Residence -self-managed- (C.A.V., Museo y Residencia Artística Internacional "La Neomudéjar" -autogestionado-)
La Neomudéjar (Atocha)
Zapadores City of Art (Fuencarral)
Espacio SOLO
PHotoEspaña Gallery

Anthropology museums

Museo Nacional de Antropología
Museo Africano Mundo Negro
 (San Sebastián de los Reyes)

Science museums

Royal Observatory of Madrid
Museo Nacional de Ciencias Naturales
Museo Geominero
National Museum of Science and Technology
Alcobendas center (collection and exhibitions)
Madrid center (library, archive and warehouse)
Royal Botanical Garden
Madrid Planetarium
Technological collection of Telefónica
Museum of Health and Public Hygiene at the Charmartin campus of the Carlos III Health Institute

Miscellaneous

Museo Naval de Madrid
Museo del Traje
Railway Museum
EMT Museum
Fire Museum
National Library of Spain Museum

Royal Tapestry Factory
 (History of the city of Madrid from prehistory to the transferring of the royal court to the Village in 1561)
Museo Casa de la Moneda (Madrid) (House of Coins Museum)

Royal Conservatory Museum
Museo del Aire
Infante de Orleans Foundation (Historical Airplanes in Flight Museum)
Guardia Civil Museum

Eduardo Torroja Museum
Postal and Telegraph Museum
EFE Museum
Insurance Museum
Julio Castelo Matrán Naval Models Museum
Wax Museum of Madrid
Tiflológico Museum
El Capricho Park
Real Madrid Museum (Santiago Bernabéu Stadium)
Atlético Madrid Museum (Metropolitano Stadium)
Casa Museo Ratón Pérez
Museum of Illusions

University museums

 (UCM)
Javier Puerta Museum of Anatomy (UCM)
Museum of Comparative Anatomy of Vertebrate Animals (UCM)
Museum of American Archaeology and Ethnology (UCM)
Museum of Astronomy and Geodesy (UCM)
Museum of Entomology (UCM)
Hispanic Pharmacy Museum (UCM)
Museum of Geology (UCM)
Museum of Dentistry "Luis de Macorra" (UCM)
Complutense Optical Museum (UCM)
Pedagogical Textile Museum (UCM)
Complutense Veterinarian Museum (UCM)
Museum of Medical and Forensic Anthropology, Paleopathology and Criminalistics (UCM)
Laboratory Museum of History of Education (UCM)
Computer Museum García Santesmases (UCM)
Pedagogical Museum of Children Art  (UCM)
Olavide Museum (UCM)
Joaquín Serna Museum (UPM)
Torres Quevedo Museum (UPM)
Museum of Agronomy (UPM)
Museum of Applied Geology (UPM)
Museum of topographical instruments (UPM)
Museum of telecommunications (UPM)
INEF (National Institute for Physical Education) Museum (UPM)
 (UPM)
Technological Museum (UPM)
 (UAM)
 Museum Mineralogy Museum]  (UAM)
Museum of the School of Engineering (UAM)

Defunct museums

See also
List of museums in Barcelona
List of museums in Málaga
List of museums in Spain

References

Museums
 
Museums in Madrid
Madrid
Museums
Madrid